Efstathios Papadionysiou, commonly known as Stathis Papadionysiou (born September 15, 1992) is a Greek professional basketball player who last played for Charilaos Trikoupis of the Greek A2 Basket League. At a height of 1.97 m (6'5 ") tall, he plays at the shooting guard and small forward positions.

Professional career
Papadionysiou began his pro career in the 2013–14 season, with AEK Athens of the Greek 2nd Division. He then played with AEK Athens in Greece's First Division, in the following 2014–15 season. After that, Papadionysiou played with the Greek clubs Pagrati Athens (2015–16), Aiolos Astakou (2016–17), Iraklis Thessaloniki (2017–18), and Charilaos Trikoupis (2018–2020). While he was a member of Charilaos Trikoupis, he won the Greek 2nd Division championship, in the 2019–20 season.

Papadionysiou joined the Olympiacos B Development Team, for the 2020–21 season. On August 8, 2021, Papadionysiou returned to Charilaos Trikoupis.

National team career
Papadionysiou was a member of the junior national teams of Greece. With Greece's junior national teams, he played at the 2010 FIBA Europe Under-18 Championship, and at the 2012 FIBA Europe Under-20 Championship.

References

External links
FIBA Profile
FIBA Europe Profile
ProBallers.com Profile
RealGM.com Profile
Eurobasket.com Profile
Greek Basket League Profile 
Greek Basket League Profile 

1992 births
Living people
AEK B.C. players
Aiolos Astakou B.C. players
Charilaos Trikoupis B.C. players
Greek men's basketball players
Iraklis Thessaloniki B.C. players
Olympiacos B.C. B players
Pagrati B.C. players
Shooting guards
Small forwards
Basketball players from Athens